The Rimini trolleybus system, also known as the Rimini–Riccione trolleybus line, forms part of the public transport network of the city and comune of Rimini, in the region of Emilia-Romagna, northern Italy.  In operation since 1939, the system links Rimini with the nearby seaside resort and comune of Riccione.

History
The line was established on 1 January 1939, with an initial fleet of small Fiat 635F and 656F CGE trolleybuses.  Responsibility for the management of the line was entrusted to SITA of Florence until 1959.

Classified as line 11, the system passed into the control of ATAM of Rimini by 1960.

Under ATAM's management, the Rimini–Miramare part of the line was numbered 10, which is now the number used to denote the Miramare–Fiera line, operated by diesel buses.  However, the reversing loop in the overhead wires that allowed trolleybus services to terminate in Miramare was recently dismantled for the construction of a roundabout.  At present, the only reversing loop on the system is at the Miramare Talassoterapico roundabout at Piazzale Giardini in Riccione.

The Miramare section also previously had unique rotating lights to indicate any malfunction on the line, but this feature has also been dismantled.

In the past, all substations serving the line (excluding the new Riccione Abissinia) were equipped with mercury vapor rectifiers, which were housed in buildings with a central chimney to assist with cooling.  However, the substations are now all equipped with solid state low thermal output transformers.

In 1992, ATAM was renamed TRAM, and in 2001 its name was modified again, to TRAM Servizi.

Until 2 November 1998, the Rimini terminus of line 11 was in the central Piazza Tre Martiri.  On that date, following the conversion of the piazza into a pedestrian area, the terminus was moved to Piazzale San Girolamo, on Via Dante Alighieri.  From 1 August 2001 the Riccione terminus, previously sited in Piazzale Giardini, was moved to the area of Riccione Terme, in Piazzale Marinai d'Italia, while the services limited to piazzale Curiel are shown as "11/".

In 2009, the trolleybus fleet was renewed: on 14 September that year, the Volvo B59 Mauri trolleybuses were taken out of service, as the USTIF had revoked their authorisations. From the following day, the trolleybus lines were temporarily operated by diesel fueled buses and articulated buses pending the completion of work to be performed on the Via Rodi underpass to allow the circulation of new Van Hool AG300T articulated trolleybuses, which entered service from June 2010. Five of these trolleybuses were purchased, with the first unit, delivered in June 2009, carrying out the line tests in the ensuing weeks.

Also beginning the same day, due to the inability of the new articulated buses to perform a U-turn in the narrow space of Piazzale San Girolamo, the terminus was moved to the nearby Piazzale Gramsci. However, the overhead wire was not extended, so the new articulated vehicles had to cover the portion of line separating the new terminal from the old one by using their auxiliary diesel engine.
 
On 1 June 2011, the Via Aponia–Piazzale Gramsci route was closed; since that date the terminus has been at Via Dante.

Line description
Especially in summer, the Rimini-Riccione trolleybus line plays an important role, connecting the Rimini town centre, including the Rimini railway station, with the city's southern coast and the city of Riccione.  Also known as line 11, it is considered by Mobilità di Rimini as a "shoreline", with an urban section (at normal rate) between Rimini and Miramare and an inter-municipal section (with higher priced tickets) between Rimini and Riccione.

The critical point in the whole line is the railway underpass at the Rimini railway station.  It has a tight bend and limited clearance, forcing the trolleybuses to flatten their trolley poles near their roofs, with the risk that the trolley poles will come off the wires.

In the section from Riccione Terme to Riccione Piazzale Curiel, the overhead wire is of a rigid type cable.  From Piazzale Curiel onwards, after the reversing loop, the wire is a floating type, with Swiss-style articulated hangers to eliminate kickback movement. At Piazzale Curiel there is also an automated exchange with infrared remote control.

The line is supplied with current by the following substations: Centro (formerly an ATAM depot, now a car park), Bellariva, Riccione Alba and Riccione Abissinia.

Trolleybus fleet

Retired trolleybuses
The following trolleybuses previously used in Rimini have since been withdrawn from service:

5 Fiat 2401 Cansa nos. 1011-1015, delivered 1954, withdrawn c 1978.
17 Volvo B59 / Mauri nos. 1001-1017 (their plate numbers were FO - TRAM 1001-1017, as they were purchased before Rimini became a province), delivered 1976-79, withdrawn 2002–2009.

Heritage Fleet 

The Volvo B59/Mauri no. 1017 was then sold in 2012 to Vulcangas in Poggio Torriana, a company managed by Dr. Enrico Fabbri, a transport engineer and former director of the late ATAM Rimini. Fabbri became the director of ATAM at age 27 and was the one who successfully brought the Volvo B59/Mauri to Rimini after the trial of its prototype (later no. 1001 at ATAM/Tram Servizi) built at the manufacturing of Ambrogio Mauri (1931-1997), now the Mauri Bus Systems. 

Fabbri never forgot his past in the public transport system of Rimini and took responsibility on the restoration of no. 1017, which is exposed at Vulcangas and was presented to the public on the 27th July 2018, the 40th anniversary of Mauri Trolleybuses' debut in Rimini.

Current fleet
Rimini's trolleybus fleet presently consists of six Van Hool AG300T articulated vehicles (fleet numbers 36501-36506), the first of which entered service in June 2010.

(Note: this description was changed on June 18th, 2016. Actually I have seen busses No. 36502 - 06, so No. 501 still is not sure).

See also

Rimini railway station
List of trolleybus systems in Italy

References

Further reading

External links

 
 
Images of the Rimini trolleybus system, at railfaneurope.net

This article is based upon a translation of the Italian language version as at September 2011.

Rimini
Rimini
Rimini
Transport in Emilia-Romagna